Mangrovibacterium marinum is a Gram-negative, rod-shaped, facultatively anaerobic and non-motile bacterium from the genus of Mangrovibacterium which has been isolated from sediments from the coast of Weihai.

References

Bacteroidia
Bacteria described in 2016